Jeong Do-jeon is a 2014 South Korean television series starring Cho Jae-hyun in the title role as Jeong Do-jeon, a real-life historical figure (1342–1398) who was one of the most powerful scholars and politicians of his time and a close supporter of King Taejo, the founder of the Joseon Dynasty. The period drama shows the crucial role Jeong had in the planning and founding of Joseon and the obstacles he faced in the process, as well as his lasting impact on Joseon's politics and laws. It aired on KBS1 from January 4 to June 29, 2014 on Saturdays and Sundays at 21:40 for 50 episodes.

Jeong Do-jeon received solid ratings and was hailed by critics as one of the most "authentic and realistic" Korean historical dramas in the new millennium. The series won the Grand Prize (Daesang), Best Director and Best Writer at the 41st Korea Broadcasting Awards, and Cho Jae-hyun won Best TV Actor at the 50th Baeksang Arts Awards.

Plot
The drama begins in 1374, the final year of King Gongmin of Goryeo. Those times were marked by abuse of power, corruption and political chaos, as government officials and scholars dream of a new dynasty and a new era.

Jeong Do-jeon was an aristocrat and politician who assisted Yi Seong-gye (later King Taejo) when he seized power and established a new dynasty, Joseon. After Taejo became the first king of Joseon, he left all state affairs to Jeong, making him the most powerful and influential man who shaped the 500-year-long dynasty by laying down Joseon's ideological, institutional, and legal foundations. Deciding all policies from military affairs, diplomacy, and down to education, he laid down Joseon's political system and tax laws, replaced Buddhism with Confucianism as national religion, moved the capital from Kaesong to Hanyang (present-day Seoul), changed the kingdom's political system from feudalism to highly centralized bureaucracy, and wrote a code of laws that eventually became Joseon's constitution. He even decided the names of each palace, eight provinces, and districts in the capital. He also worked to free many slaves and reformed land policy.

Jeong died just six years after the foundation of Joseon, killed in 1398 by his political archenemy Yi Bang-won, Taejo's fifth son. Yi killed his two half-brothers (including the crown prince) as well as Jeong and his supporters in a coup that came to be known as the "First Strife of Princes", eventually becoming King Taejong, the third king of Joseon.

Cast

Main characters
Cho Jae-hyun as Jeong Do-jeon
Kang Yi-seok as young Jeong Do-jeon
Yoo Dong-geun as Yi Seong-gye, later King Taejo
Park Yeong-gyu as Yi In-im
Seo In-seok as Choe Yeong
Im Ho as Jeong Mong-ju
Won Duk-hyun as young Jeong Mong-ju
Ahn Jae-mo as Yi Bang-won, later King Taejong

Supporting characters

People surrounding Jeong Do-jeon
Lee Ah-hyun as Lady Choi, Jeong Do-jeon's wife
Lee Choon-shik as Deuk-bo Ah-beom
Im Dae-ho as Nam Eun
Lee Byung-wook as Yoon So-jong
Jeon Hyeon as Jo Joon
Park Yoo-seung as Shim Hyo-saeng
Kim Jung-min as Jung Jin
Lee Doo-seok as Jung Young
Yoo Jang-young as Jung Yoo

People surrounding Yi Seong-gye
Lee Il-hwa as Lady Kang, later Queen Sindeok 
Sun Dong-hyuk as Yi Ji-ran
Kang In-ki as Yi Bang-woo, later Prince Jinan
Lee Tae-rim as Yi Bang-gwa, later King Jeongjong
Kim Yoon-tae as Jo Young-gyu
Song Yong-tae as Bae Geuk-ryeom
Song Geum-sik as Byun An-ryeol
Park Byung-ho as Muhak

Goryeo Conservative Party
Jung Ho-keun as Im Kyun-mi
Kim Min-sang as Uhm Heung-bang
Bang Hyung-joo as Ji Yoon
Kwon Tae-won as Ahn Sa-ki

Goryeo Royal House
Kim Myung-soo as King Gongmin
Lee Deok-hee as Queen Myeongdeok
Lee Seung-min as Consort, Lady Jeong of Ahn clan
Lee So-yoon as Consort, Lady Yik of Han clan
Park Jin-woo as King Woo
Jung Yoon-seok as Monino, later King Woo
Jeon Ye-seo as Lady Jang, Monino's nanny
Seo Yi-an as Consort Geun of the Yi clan
Kim Jin-tae as Kyung Bok-heung
Lee Jung-sung as Choe Man-saeng
Seo Woo-jin as Hong Ryun

Young Scholars/Intellectuals
Park Ji-il as Yi Saek
Kim Seung-wook as Park Sang-choong
Lee Kwang-ki as Ha Ryun
Kim Cheol-ki as Kwon Geun
Jung Hee-tae as Yi Soong-in
Shin Yong-gyu as Yi Cheom

People of Geopyeong Bugok
Jang Tae-sung as Hwang Cheon-bok
Lee Dae-ro as Hwang Yeon
Kang Ye-sol as Yang Ji

Production
Jeong Do-jeon was broadcaster KBS's response to mounting criticisms against historical dramas that have come to rely too much on fiction rather than facts. Korean TV critics called for the restoration of authentic period pieces, which had become increasingly rare since the beginning of the new millennium. Hoping that the drama can simultaneously entertain and retain historical integrity, Jang Seong-hwan, a KBS executive said during the press conference, "We have been eager to produce this project for a long time. As a public broadcaster, we felt that we had a duty to create dramas that promote a proper awareness of history."

The drama sets itself from others in the same genre by focusing on the life of a politician rather than the lives of monarchs. To create Jeong Do-jeon, the production team formed an advisory panel that consisted of history experts, all with doctorates or master's degrees in Korean history, concentrating on the era in which Jeong lived. The cast members also attended a four-month course taught by famed historian Lee Deok-il on Confucianism and the various government regulations that were created with the start of the Joseon era (while Goryeo's national religion was Buddhism, Joseon was built strictly upon Confucian values). The words quoted by Jeong Do-jeon, "If you capture the hearts of the people, the people obey you. But if you fail to win their hearts, they will indeed betray you," were in the production notes on the drama's website.

Head writer Jeong Hyeon-min in particular perused many books on the Goryeo times, as well as biographies of the figures in the drama. Jeong had previously worked for a decade as an aide to 10 Korean lawmakers from both the ruling Saenuri Party and the main opposition Democratic Party, and his ability to approach the drama's plot from a political spectrum was the reason executive producer Kim Hyeong-il hired him to write the TV series. Some cultural observers noted that the current political situation in Korea - with liberals and conservatives locked in power games - was quite similar to the setting of Jeong Do-jeon. Director Kang Byung-taek called Jeong "rational and practical. The two are important values in Korea today."

Reception
Jeong Do-jeon received solid average ratings of 12 percent (according to AGB Nielsen Korea), and the drama's official website received 500 posts in its first two weeks. Unlike other Korean dramas, its primary viewer demographic are men over 40.

Another factor that has contributed to its success is the recent publication of books on Jeong's life. The history books led another broadcaster MBC to also plan a drama about the pivotal scholar. However, the success of KBS's program has caused MBC to postpone its plans indefinitely.

In addition, KBS worked to create synergy with its history talk show, The Day, History Journal, which runs at 10:30 p.m. on Sundays, right after Jeong Do-jeon finishes. Since the drama's first episode, the history talk show has dealt with Jeong, the fall of Goryeo and the rise of Joseon over three consecutive episodes. The history talk show invites not just historians as panel members, but also poets, film directors and pop culture critics.

Awards and nominations

References

External links
  
 

2014 South Korean television series debuts
2014 South Korean television series endings
Korean Broadcasting System television dramas
Korean-language television shows
Television series by KBS Media
Television series set in the Joseon dynasty
Television series set in Goryeo
South Korean historical television series
Television series set in the 14th century
Television shows set in Seoul
Television shows set in Kaesong
Television shows set in South Hamgyong Province